The France men's national under-19 volleyball team represents France in international men's volleyball competitions and friendly matches under the age 19 and it is ruled by the French Volleyball Federation body that is an affiliate of the Federation of International Volleyball FIVB and also part of the European Volleyball Confederation CEV.

Results

Summer Youth Olympics
 Champions   Runners up   Third place   Fourth place

FIVB U19 World Championship
 Champions   Runners up   Third place   Fourth place

Europe U19 / U18 Championship
 Champions   Runners up   Third place   Fourth place

Team

Current squad

The following is the French roster in the 2015 FIVB Volleyball Boys' U19 World Championship.

Head Coach: Olivier Audabram

References

External links
 French Volleyball Federation 

National men's under-19 volleyball teams
Volleyball
Volleyball in France